This article will display the squads for the 2011 UEFA European Under-19 Championship.
Only players born on or after 1 January 1992 were eligible to play.

Every team had to submit a list of 18 players. Two of them must be goalkeepers.

Age, caps and goals are as of the start of the tournament, July 20, 2011.

Players in bold have later been capped at full international level.

Group A

Head coach: Jaroslav Hřebík

The following players were named in the squad on 15 July 2011.

Head coach: Leonidas Vokolos

Head coach: Paul Doolin

Head coach:  Lucian Burchel

Group B

Head coach: Marc Van Geersom

Head coach: Dejan Govedarica

Head coach: Ginés Meléndez

Head coach: Kemal Özdeş

References

External links
Official website

Squads
UEFA European Under-19 Championship squads